Hezhou or He Prefecture (合州) was a zhou (prefecture) in imperial China centering on modern Hechuan District, Chongqing, China. It existed (intermittently) from 556 to 1913.

Geography
The administrative region of Hezhou in the Tang dynasty is in modern western Chongqing on the border with Sichuan. It probably includes parts of modern: 
Under the administration of Chongqing:
Hechuan District
Tongliang District
Dazu District
Under the administration of Guang'an, Sichuan:
Wusheng County

References
 

Prefectures of the Sui dynasty
Prefectures of the Tang dynasty
Prefectures of the Song dynasty
Prefectures of the Yuan dynasty
Prefectures of Former Shu
Prefectures of Later Shu
Prefectures of Later Tang
Former prefectures in Chongqing
Former prefectures in Sichuan
Subprefectures of the Ming dynasty
Departments of the Qing dynasty